is a professional Japanese baseball player. He plays pitcher for the Tokyo Yakult Swallows.

References 

1996 births
Living people
Baseball people from Tokyo
Kokugakuin University alumni
Japanese baseball players
Nippon Professional Baseball pitchers
Tokyo Yakult Swallows players